Anne Gilbert may refer to:

 Anne Hart Gilbert (1768–1834), Methodist writer, teacher and abolitionist
 Anne Hartley Gilbert (1821–1904), British-American actress
 Ann Gilbert Getty (1941–2020), American philanthropist and publisher
 Anne Yvonne Gilbert, British artist and book illustrator

See also 
 Anne & Gilbert, a 2005 musical based on the Anne of Green Gables series of books
 Anna Gilbert (disambiguation)